Mykal Walker (born August 28, 1997) is an American football linebacker for the Atlanta Falcons of the National Football League (NFL). He played college football at Fresno State.

College career

Walker played two seasons at Azusa Pacific University before transferring to Fresno State. In 2019, he had 91 tackles, 11.5 tackles for loss and 5 pass deflections. Walker finished his two seasons at Fresno State with 182 tackles including 22.5 tackles for a loss, 10 pass defenses and 6.5 sacks. Walker was named a two-time First-team All-Mountain West Conference selection, along with being named the Defensive MVP during the 2018 Mountain West Conference Football Championship Game. Walker ran the 40-yard dash in 4.65 seconds.

Professional career

Walker was selected by the Atlanta Falcons with the 119th overall pick in the fourth round of the 2020 NFL Draft.

2021 season
In Week 14 Walker Intercepted Cam Newton and returned it 66 yards for a touchdown in a 29-21 win over the Carolina Panthers

Personal life
Mykal Walker has a twin brother Malyk. Their father, Michael, played for the Fresno State Bulldogs football team, subsequently joined the New England Patriots, but never played at the NFL level. Michael died of colon cancer in 2012. Mykal Walker's first child, a son, was born in December 2021. His cousin is former NFL football running-back Maurice Jones-Drew.

References

External links
Atlanta Falcons bio
Fresno State Bulldogs bio

1997 births
Living people
Sportspeople from Fresno, California
Players of American football from California
American football linebackers
Azusa Pacific Cougars football players
Fresno State Bulldogs football players
Atlanta Falcons players
Twin sportspeople
American twins